The Pokhara Cup, currently known as the Manakamana Cable Car Pokhara Cup, is an annual international football knockout tournament held in Pokhara, Nepal and is organized by ANFA Kaski. For sponsorship reasons, it was formerly also known as Safal Pokhara Cup.

History
The tournament was formed as the Pokhara Gold Cup in 2011. ANFA Kaski announced that it would form new subcommittees to account for the administration of the cup.

Venue

The Pokhara Cup is held at the Pokhara Rangasala, a multipurpose sports venue that is frequently used for football.

Previous winners

*Denotes Nepali calendar date
**Denotes Gregorian calendar date

Most successful teams

References

]

Football cup competitions in Nepal
Sport in Pokhara
2011 establishments in Nepal